The 2007 New Zealand Open Grand Prix (officially known as the KLRC New Zealand Open 2007 for sponsorship reasons) was a badminton tournament which took place in Auckland, New Zealand from 14 to 20 May 2007. It had a total purse of $50,000.

Tournament 
The 2007 New Zealand Open Grand Prix was the second tournament of the 2007 BWF Grand Prix Gold and Grand Prix and also part of the New Zealand Open championships which has been held since 1990. This tournament was organized by the Badminton New Zealand and sanctioned by the BWF.

Venue 
This international tournament was held at Auckland Badminton Hall in Auckland, New Zealand.

Point distribution 
Below is the point distribution for each phase of the tournament based on the BWF points system for the BWF Grand Prix event.

Prize money 
The total prize money for this tournament was US$50,000. Distribution of prize money was in accordance with BWF regulations.

Men's singles

Seeds 

 Andrew Smith (quarter-finals)
 Lee Tsuen Seng (semi-finals)
 Sairul Amar Ayob (third round)
 Roslin Hashim (quarter-finals)
 Chan Yan Kit (quarter-finals)
 John Moody (second round)
 Ng Wei (third round)
 Yeoh Kay Bin (semi-finals)

Finals

Top half

Section 1

Section 2

Bottom half

Section 3

Section 4

Women's singles

Seeds 

 Pi Hongyan (semi-finals)
 Yip Pui Yin (semi-finals)
 Huang Chia-chi (withdrew)
 Chie Umezu (final)
 Tracey Hallam (quarter-finals)
 Rachel Hindley (third round)
 Sutheaswari Mudukasan (second round)
 Kanako Yonekura (second round)

Finals

Top half

Section 1

Section 2

Bottom half

Section 3

Section 4

Men's doubles

Seeds 

 Albertus Susanto Njoto / Yohan Hadikusumo Wiratama (final)
 Aji Basuki Sindoro / Ashley Brehaut (second round)
 Svetoslav Stoyanov / Mihail Popov (second round)
 Glenn Warfe / Ross Smith (second round)

Finals

Top half

Section 1

Section 2

Bottom half

Section 3

Section 4

Women's doubles

Seeds 

 Lim Pek Siah / Joanne Quay (second round)
 Élodie Eymard / Weny Rahmawati (quarter-finals)
 Vanessa Neo / Shinta Mulia Sari (second round)
 Suzanne Rayappan / Jenny Wallwork (withdrew)

Finals

Top half

Section 1

Section 2

Bottom half

Section 3

Section 4

Mixed doubles

Seeds 

 Daniel Shirley /  Joanne Quay (second round)
 Svetoslav Stoyanov / Élodie Eymard (semi-finals)
 Ross Smith / Tania Luiz (second round)
 Glenn Warfe / Susan Dobson (quarter-finals)
 Tanama Putra Alroy / Chau Hoi Wah (semi-finals)
 Devin Lahardi Fitriawan / Lita Nurlita (champions)
 Anggun Nugroho / Nitya Krishinda Maheswari (final)
 Benjamin Walklate / Erin Carroll (quarter-finals)

Finals

Top half

Section 1

Section 2

Bottom half

Section 3

Section 4

References

External links 
Tournament Link

New Zealand Open (badminton)
New Zealand Open Grand Prix
New Zealand Open Grand Prix
New Zealand Open